James Petzke is an American politician serving as a member of the Idaho House of Representatives for the 21A district. He assumed office on December 1, 2022.

Early life and education 
Petzke was raised in Hailey, Idaho, and graduated from Wood River High School. He earned an associate degree and Bachelor of Arts degree from Boise State University and a Master of Liberal Arts in finance from the Harvard Extension School.

Career 
From 2008 to 2011, Petzke worked as an intern in the Blaine County School District. He joined Bodybuilding.com in 2014, working as a SEO specialist and SEO program manager before leaving the company in 2016. Petzke is the co-founder and CEO of Upland Optics, a company that produces sporting optics for hunters. He was elected to the Idaho House of Representatives in November 2022. Petzke is a member of the House Appropriations Committee.

References 

Living people
Idaho Republicans
Members of the Idaho House of Representatives
People from Hailey, Idaho
People from Blaine County, Idaho
Boise State University alumni
Harvard Extension School alumni
People from Meridian, Idaho
People from Ada County, Idaho
Year of birth missing (living people)